Pliomelaena brevifrons is a species of tephritid or fruit flies in the genus Pliomelaena of the family Tephritidae.

Distribution
Cameroon & Ethiopia to South Africa.

References

Tephritinae
Taxa named by Mario Bezzi
Insects described in 1918
Diptera of Africa